is a Japanese horror adventure game by Japanese developer and publisher Success Corporation, released for the PlayStation 2 in Japan on April 5, 2008, and was later ported to Microsoft Windows with extra content. A reduced price "popular edition," included in the SuperLite 2000 Series, was released on April 28, 2009. 

In addition, this new version would receive an official English language option for the very first time, and be given a release outside Japan.

Plot
Aoi Shiro is an adventure game that sets stage in both the modern real world and a mythical world. Aoi Shiro is the second in a line of yuri visual novel-style PS2 games from game maker SUCCESS and takes place in the same universe as its predecessor, Akai Ito.

The Seijou Girls Academy's Kendo Club is traveling to Shoushinji for summer training camp. Near there is an island, Urashima, where a demon extermination took place long ago. They arrive around the time of a festival which honors a god that is worshipped by the people of Urashima, it celebrates the onitaiji and ensure another year of health for the people. Around the time of the festival, the weather around Urashima worsens and storms will come.

A few days into their training Osanai Syouko finds a girl washed up on the shores near the location of the training camp who can not speak and doesn't seem to know much about herself. Aoi Shiro's story varies greatly based upon the player's decisions, which not only affect the flow of the story but also the ending the player receives, several of which suggest romantic feelings among the female characters.

Characters

The main character of this game, a 2nd year student at Seijou Academy. Her nickname is "Osa". She's the well-liked, ace of the kendo team who takes on the role of captain after the former 3rd year captain retires. Since she is the serious and hardworking type, she often gets teased and is on the receiving end of jokes.

A first year student at Seijou Academy, Yasumi is delicate girl who is the manager of the kendo team. Although she doesn't have any particular illness, she has much less stamina than normal people, so she finds it difficult to partake in any strenuous exercise. On the other hand, she's extremely determined and diligent about her job as a manager, and she does her best to contribute to the team's success. Momoko and a few others refer to her endearingly as "Zawacchi" which comes from "zawa" in her last name, Aizawa. She has a crush on Syouko which Momoko often makes fun of.

The young girl who washes up on the shores near the location of the training camp. She looks to be about 10 to 12 years old. However, her name and age are all unknown. When she wakes up from after being rescued by Yasumi and Syouko, she is found being unable to speak. However, despite this, she makes up for her inability to communicate verbally with animated facial expressions, giving her a cute, childlike appearance. She becomes particularly attached to Syouko and Yasumi.

Former kendo team captain at Seijou Academy and the cousin of Syouko's mother.

A young girl with a light, carefree personality who stays over at Shoushinji, the location of the training camp. She arrives there earlier than Syouko and the others. At first glance, Syouko is captivated by Migiwa's beauty and fashionable clothing. However, once Migiwa shows her arrogance, Syouko quickly disbands that thought and categorizes Migiwa as one of those 'hard-to-deal-with' girls.

A person of many mysteries and of a dignified presence. Kohaku's left eye is constantly closed.

Friend and roommate of Yasumi. Momoko is an energetic girl who likes to play pranks. Although she only begins kendo in high school, she shows great potential, despite having only trained for less than half a year. Because of her high, natural athletic ability, strong determination, and willpower, many already peg her as the next ace of kendo.

The former kendo team captain gave her the nickname of Hime, she is very kind and comes from a well off family that have sheltered her in her upbringing.

Development and release
Success first announced the production of a new visual novel in August, 2006, two years after the release of its previous visual novel Akai Ito. The game was first released on the PlayStation 2 on April 5, 2008. Success announced in August 2008 that Aoi Shiro would be released for Microsoft Windows on November 21, 2008, a free game demo of Aoi Shiro for Windows became available for download at Success' official website on October 3, 2008. Aoi Shiro for Windows was the number two top seller in its first week of release in Japanese PC game sales. A reduced price "popular edition," included in developer and publisher Success' SuperLite 2000 Series, was released on April 28, 2009, for PlayStation 2. On September 18, 2009, an unofficial English translation for PC version of Aoi Shiro was released.

Other media
Aoi Shiro has had two manga adaptations.  was written by Fumotogawa Tomoyuki and illustrated by Edoya Pochi it was first serialized in Comic Yuri Hime in 2008 and later release into one bound volume. The story takes place before the start of the game and focuses on the relationship between Momoko and Yasumi when they first become roommates at Seijou Girls Academy dormitory. A second manga, titled , was serialized in Comic Rush which was also written by Fumotogawa Tomoyuki and illustrated by Katase Yu. Three bound volumes were released in Japan between January 7, 2008, and October 6, 2008, published by Jive, This adaptation follows the video game storyline focusing on Nami's route.

A free Aoi Shiro web novel was released on the game's official website, and follows one of the storylines accessible when playing Yasumi route in the video game. The novel has been unofficially translated into English as of 2008.

An Internet radio show that was used to promote the video game was broadcast from March 1, 2008, to October 12, 2008, on Galge Radio Station. The show, which aired bi-weekly, was hosted by Yamaguchi Rikako and Ookubo Aiko, who voice Yasumi and Momoko in the game, respectively.

References

External links
Aoi shiro official website 

English translation of web novel
Full game English translation project
Akai Ito official website 
Aoishiro/Akai Ito HD official website  

2008 video games
Bishōjo games
Fantasy video games
Ichijinsha manga
Japan-exclusive video games
LGBT-related video games
Manga series
PlayStation 2 games
Romance video games
Success (company) games
Video games developed in Japan
Visual novels
Windows games
Yuri (genre) anime and manga
Yuri (genre) video games